Yuri Alexeyevich Ardashev (born 22 January 1965) is a Russian theatre director, actor, and professional drummer. Opera La voix humaine by Francis Poulenc, directed by Yuri Ardashev, became the nominee of the national award "Golden Mask" (2009) in the categories "Best Performance", "Best Actress".

Biography
Yuri Ardashev studied at the Kirov Academy of Arts and the State musical college named after Gnessins on Percussion instruments. He graduated from the Gerasimov Institute of Cinematography (studio Vladimir Naumov) and Russian Academy of Theatre Arts (Master Yuri Lyubimov), specializing in directing.

He worked in TV's Companies Star Plus, Grand TV (Vyatka), filmed commercials and documentaries, worked as an actor and assistant director at the Taganka Theatre. As assistant attended by the director Yuri Lyubimov of performances:

 "Suf(f)le" on the works of Friedrich Nietzsche, Franz Kafka, Samuel Beckett, James Joyce
 "Go and stop progress (Oberiu)" on the works of Alexander Vvedensky, Daniil Kharms, Nikolay Zabolotsky, Aleksei Kruchenykh, N. Oleynikov
 Before and After" Bricolage on the works of poets of the Silver Age of Russian Poetry.

Since January 2011 working at the State Russian Drama Theater named by Bestuzhev.

Work in film
 Past i present
 Medicines for Termintor (2003)
 Reflection. Thieves in Law (2006)
 Boris Grebenshchikov. Teleportation in Vyatka
 Yuri Lyubimov. Portraits of Age
 Reflection. Advergames" (2004)

Works in the theater
 Three Sisters King Lear. Pause Theatre "GITIS"
 Jerry Bock, D. Ogayn Fiddler on the Roof. Taganka Theater
 Francis Poulenc La voix humaine Moscow International House of Music, Theatre hall
 Hans Christian Andersen The Snow Queen State Cultural Center and Museum by Vysotsky
 V. Rozov, Finding Joy. State Youth Theater of Altai in city Barnaul.
 A. Zaytsevsky "Miracle Bell. State Russian Drama Theatre named after Bestuzhev in city Ulan-Ude

Actor's work in Taganka Theatre
 The Brothers Karamazov (Skotoprigonevsk) by Fyodor Dostoyevsky. Directed by Yuri Lyubimov – Gregory
 The Castle by Franz Kafka. Directed by Yuri Lyubimov – Mom
 Marat/Sade by Peter Weiss. Directed by Yuri Lyubimov – Nurse
 Woe from Wit – Woe to mind – Woe to Wit by Aleksandr Griboyedov. Directed by Yuri Lyubimov – Platon Mikhailovich Gorichev
 Antigone by Sophocles – Jester
 Theatrical Novel by Mikhail Bulgakov. Directed by Yuri Lyubimov – Bust Ostrowski, Janitor
 Fiddler on the Roof by Jerry Bock (small stage). Directed by Yuri Ardashev – Sergeant

Nominations and awards
 Award of "binoculars" for the most interesting theatrical experiment of 1999 – Three Sisters International Film Festival grand prize DetectiveFEST "Law and Society" – Reflection. Thieves in Law (2006)
 Prize for best director at the Independent Television Festival – Boris Grebenshchikov. Teleportation in Vyatka Prize for best director, original theatrical festival in Moscow university "Student Spring" – King Lear. Pause Francis Poulenc La voix humaine'' – nominated for National Award "Golden Mask" (2009) in the category "Best Performance".

References

External links
 The Human Voice
 Vesti Kirov
 GRDT
 News of the Kirov region
 Three Sisters

Russian theatre directors
1965 births
Living people
Russian male actors
Gerasimov Institute of Cinematography alumni
Russian Academy of Theatre Arts alumni